Neill Rimmer (born 13 November 1967) is an English former professional football midfielder. He played in the Football League primarily for Wigan Athletic.

Playing career
Born in Liverpool, Rimmer became an apprentice with Everton, turning professional in April 1984. He made one first team appearance for Everton, as a substitute, before being released at the end of the 1984–85 season. In August 1985 he joined Ipswich Town, but made less than 30 first team appearances over the next three seasons. In July 1988 he joined Wigan Athletic. During the 1990–91 season he had a spell on loan with Mossley, playing three times. He returned to Wigan and went on to make over 250 first team appearances.

He later played for Altrincham, where he played five times in the Football Conference during the 1996–97 season and Scarborough.

Coaching career
From September 2009 to June 2010, Neill ran developmental programs for Lincoln Youth Soccer in Lincoln, Massachusetts in the USA. He later worked for the Wigan Athletic academy as a coach.

In June 2017 he was appointed joint manager of Ashton Town alongside Dave Dempsey.

References

1967 births
English footballers
Everton F.C. players
Ipswich Town F.C. players
Wigan Athletic F.C. players
Mossley A.F.C. players
Altrincham F.C. players
Scarborough F.C. players
English Football League players
Living people
Footballers from Liverpool
Wigan Athletic F.C. non-playing staff
Association football midfielders
English football managers
Ashton Town A.F.C. managers